This is a list of the bird species recorded in the Netherlands. The avifauna of the Netherlands included a total of 564 species documented in the wild through October 2022 according to Checklist of Dutch bird species with supplemental additions from Avibase.. The checklist "incorporates all decisions by the Dutch rarities committee 'Commissie Dwaalgasten Nederlandse Avifauna' (CDNA) and the Dutch taxonomic committee 'Commissie Systematiek Nederlandse Avifauna' (CSNA)". Of these species, 13 have been introduced by humans, and one is extinct. Two species were inadequately documented before 1800.

This list's taxonomic treatment (designation and sequence of orders, families and species) and nomenclature (English and scientific names) are those of The Clements Checklist of Birds of the World, 2022 edition.

The following tags have been used to highlight some categories of occurrence. The notes of population status such as "endangered" apply to the world population and are from Bird Checklists of the World.

(A) Accidental - a species that rarely or accidentally occurs in the Netherlands, requiring review by the CDNA for inclusion in the record
(I) Introduced - a species whose "ancestors originated from captivity or ship transport" and which have been established for at least 20 years per the CDNA
(B) Before 1800 - species "recorded only before 1800 (location and/or date not well enough documented)" per the CDNA

Ducks, geese, and waterfowl
Order: AnseriformesFamily: Anatidae

Anatidae includes the ducks and most duck-like waterfowl, such as geese and swans. These birds are adapted to an aquatic existence with webbed feet, flattened bills, and feathers that are excellent at shedding water due to an oily coating.

 Bar-headed goose, Anser indicus (I)
 Snow goose, Anser caerulescens
 Ross's goose, Anser rossii (A)
 Graylag goose, Anser anser
 Greater white-fronted goose, Anser albifrons
 Lesser white-fronted goose, Anser erythropus (vulnerable)
 Taiga bean-goose, Anser fabalis
 Tundra bean-goose, Anser serrirostris
 Pink-footed goose, Anser brachyrhynchus
 Brant, Branta bernicla
 Barnacle goose, Branta leucopsis
 Cackling goose, Branta hutchinsii (A)
 Canada goose, Branta canadensis
 Red-breasted goose, Branta ruficollis (A) (vulnerable)
 Mute swan, Cygnus olor
 Black swan, Cygnus atratus (I)
 Tundra swan, Cygnus columbianus (A)
 Whooper swan, Cygnus cygnus
 Egyptian goose, Alopochen aegyptiacus (I)
 Ruddy shelduck, Tadorna ferruginea
 Common shelduck, Tadorna tadorna
 Mandarin duck, Aix galericulata (I)
 Baikal teal, Sibirionetta formosa (A)
 Garganey, Spatula querquedula
 Blue-winged teal, Spatula discors (A)
 Northern shoveler, Spatula clypeata
 Gadwall, Mareca strepera
 Falcated duck, Mareca falcata (A) (near-threatened)
 Eurasian wigeon, Mareca penelope
 American wigeon, Mareca americana (A)
 Mallard, Anas platyrhynchos
 Northern pintail, Anas acuta
 Green-winged teal, Anas crecca
 Marbled teal, Marmaronetta angustirostris (A) (vulnerable)
 Red-crested pochard, Netta rufina
 Redhead, Aythya americana (A)
 Common pochard, Aythya ferina (vulnerable)
 Ring-necked duck, Aythya collaris (A)
 Ferruginous duck, Aythya nyroca (near-threatened)
 Tufted duck, Aythya fuligula
 Greater scaup, Aythya marila
 Lesser scaup, Aythya affinis (A)
 Steller's eider, Polysticta stelleri (A) (vulnerable)
 King eider, Somateria spectabilis (A)
 Common eider, Somateria mollissima (near-threatened)
 Harlequin duck, Histrionicus histrionicus (A)
 Surf scoter, Melanitta perspicillata (A)
 Velvet scoter, Melanitta fusca (vulnerable)
 White-winged scoter, Melanitta deglandi (A)
 Common scoter, Melanitta nigra
 Black scoter, Melanitta americana (A) (near-threatened)
 Long-tailed duck, Clangula hyemalis (vulnerable)
 Bufflehead, Bucephala albeola (A)
 Common goldeneye, Bucephala clangula
 Smew, Mergellus albellus
 Hooded merganser, Lophodytes cucullatus (A)
 Common merganser, Mergus merganser
 Red-breasted merganser, Mergus serrator
 Ruddy duck, Oxyura jamaicensis (I)
 White-headed duck, Oxyura leucocephala (A) (endangered)

Pheasants, grouse, and allies
Order: GalliformesFamily: Phasianidae

The Phasianidae are a family of terrestrial birds. In general, they are plump (although they vary in size) and have broad, relatively short wings.

 Black grouse, Lyrurus tetrix
 Gray partridge, Perdix perdix
 Ring-necked pheasant, Phasianus colchicus (I)
 Common quail, Coturnix coturnix

Flamingos
Order: PhoenicopteriformesFamily: Phoenicopteridae

Flamingos filter-feed on shellfish and algae. Their oddly shaped beaks are specially adapted to separate mud and silt from the food they consume and, uniquely, are used upside-down.

 Chilean flamingo, Phoenicopterus chilensis (I) (near-threatened)
 American flamingo, Phoenicopterus ruber (A)
 Greater flamingo, Phoenicopterus roseus (A)

Grebes
Order: PodicipediformesFamily: Podicipedidae

Grebes are small to medium-large freshwater diving birds. They have lobed toes and are excellent swimmers and divers. However, they have their feet placed far back on the body, making them quite ungainly on land. 

 Little grebe, Tachybaptus ruficollis
 Pied-billed grebe, Podilymbus podiceps (A)
 Horned grebe, Podiceps auritus (vulnerable)
 Red-necked grebe, Podiceps grisegena
 Great crested grebe, Podiceps cristatus
 Eared grebe, Podiceps nigricollis

Pigeons and doves
Order: ColumbiformesFamily: Columbidae

Pigeons and doves are stout-bodied birds with short necks and short slender bills with a fleshy cere.

 Rock pigeon, Columba livia (I)
 Stock dove, Columba oenas
 Common wood-pigeon, Columba palumbus
 European turtle-dove, Streptopelia turtur (vulnerable)
 Oriental turtle-dove, Streptopelia orientalis (A)
 Eurasian collared-dove, Streptopelia decaocto

Sandgrouse
Order: PterocliformesFamily: Pteroclidae

Sandgrouse have small, pigeon like heads and necks, but sturdy compact bodies. They have long pointed wings and sometimes tails and a fast direct flight. Flocks fly to watering holes at dawn and dusk. Their legs are feathered down to the toes.

 Pallas's sandgrouse, Syrrhaptes paradoxus (A)

Bustards
Order: OtidiformesFamily: Otididae

Bustards are large terrestrial birds mainly associated with dry open country and steppes in the Old World. They are omnivorous and nest on the ground. They walk steadily on strong legs and big toes, pecking for food as they go. They have long broad wings with "fingered" wingtips and striking patterns in flight. Many have interesting mating displays.

 Great bustard, Otis tarda (A) (vulnerable)
 Macqueen's bustard, Chlamydotis macqueenii (A) (vulnerable)
 Little bustard, Tetrax tetrax (A) (near-threatened)

Cuckoos
Order: CuculiformesFamily: Cuculidae

The family Cuculidae includes cuckoos, roadrunners and anis. These birds are of variable size with slender bodies, long tails and strong legs. The Old World cuckoos are brood parasites.

 Great spotted cuckoo, Clamator glandarius (A)
 Yellow-billed cuckoo, Coccyzus americanus (A)
 Common cuckoo, Cuculus canorus

Nightjars and allies
Order: CaprimulgiformesFamily: Caprimulgidae

Nightjars are medium-sized nocturnal birds that usually nest on the ground. They have long wings, short legs and very short bills. Most have small feet, of little use for walking, and long pointed wings. Their soft plumage is camouflaged to resemble bark or leaves.

 Eurasian nightjar, Caprimulgus europaeus

Swifts
Order: CaprimulgiformesFamily: Apodidae

Swifts are small birds which spend the majority of their lives flying. These birds have very short legs and never settle voluntarily on the ground, perching instead only on vertical surfaces. Many swifts have long swept-back wings which resemble a crescent or boomerang.

 Chimney swift, Chaetura pelagica (A)
 White-throated needletail, Hirundapus caudacutus (A)
 Alpine swift, Apus melba (A)
 Common swift, Apus apus
 Pallid swift, Apus pallidus (A)
 Pacific swift, Apus pacificus (A)
 Little swift, Apus affinis (A)

Rails, gallinules, and coots
Order: GruiformesFamily: Rallidae

Rallidae is a large family of small to medium-sized birds which includes the rails, crakes, coots and gallinules. Typically they inhabit dense vegetation in damp environments near lakes, swamps or rivers. In general they are shy and secretive birds, making them difficult to observe. Most species have strong legs and long toes which are well adapted to soft uneven surfaces. They tend to have short, rounded wings and to be weak fliers.

 Water rail, Rallus aquaticus
 Corn crake, Crex crex
 Spotted crake, Porzana porzana (A)
 Eurasian moorhen, Gallinula chloropus
 Eurasian coot, Fulica atra
 Western swamphen, Porphyrio porphyrio (A)
 Little crake, Zapornia parva (A)
 Baillon's crake, Zapornia pusilla

Cranes
Order: GruiformesFamily: Gruidae

Cranes are large, long-legged and long-necked birds. Unlike the similar-looking but unrelated herons, cranes fly with necks outstretched, not pulled back. Most have elaborate and noisy courting displays or "dances".

 Demoiselle crane, Anthropoides virgo (A)
 Sandhill crane, Antigone canadensis (A)
 Common crane, Grus grus

Thick-knees
Order: CharadriiformesFamily: Burhinidae

The thick-knees are a group of largely tropical waders in the family Burhinidae. They are found worldwide within the tropical zone, with some species also breeding in temperate Europe and Australia. They are medium to large waders with strong black or yellow-black bills, large yellow eyes and cryptic plumage. Despite being classed as waders, most species have a preference for arid or semi-arid habitats.

 Eurasian thick-knee, Burhinus oedicnemus

Stilts and avocets
Order: CharadriiformesFamily: Recurvirostridae

Recurvirostridae is a family of large wading birds, which includes the avocets and stilts. The avocets have long legs and long up-curved bills. The stilts have extremely long legs and long, thin, straight bills. 

 Black-winged stilt, Himantopus himantopus
 Pied avocet, Recurvirostra avosetta

Oystercatchers
Order: CharadriiformesFamily: Haematopodidae

The oystercatchers are large and noisy plover-like birds, with strong bills used for smashing or prising open molluscs.

 Eurasian oystercatcher, Haematopus ostralegus (near-threatened)

Plovers and lapwings
Order: CharadriiformesFamily: Charadriidae

The family Charadriidae includes the plovers, dotterels and lapwings. They are small to medium-sized birds with compact bodies, short, thick necks and long, usually pointed, wings. They are found in open country worldwide, mostly in habitats near water.

 Black-bellied plover, Pluvialis squatarola
 European golden-plover, Pluvialis apricaria
 American golden-plover, Pluvialis dominica (A)
 Pacific golden-plover, Pluvialis fulva (A)
 Northern lapwing, Vanellus vanellus (near-threatened)
 Gray-headed lapwing, Vanellus cinereus (A)
 Red-wattled lapwing, Vanellus indicus (A)
 Sociable lapwing, Vanellus gregarius (A) (critically endangered)
 White-tailed lapwing, Vanellus leucurus (A)
 Greater sand-plover, Charadrius leschenaultii (A)
 Caspian plover, Charadrius asiaticus (A)
 Kentish plover, Charadrius alexandrinus
 Snowy plover, Charadrius nivosus (A)
 Common ringed plover, Charadrius hiaticula
 Little ringed plover, Charadrius dubius
 Killdeer, Charadrius vociferus (A)
 Oriental plover, Charadrius veredus (A)
 Eurasian dotterel, Charadrius morinellus

Sandpipers and allies
Order: CharadriiformesFamily: Scolopacidae

Scolopacidae is a large diverse family of small to medium-sized shorebirds including the sandpipers, curlews, godwits, shanks, tattlers, woodcocks, snipes, dowitchers and phalaropes. The majority of these species eat small invertebrates picked out of the mud or soil. Variation in length of legs and bills enables multiple species to feed in the same habitat, particularly on the coast, without direct competition for food.

 Upland sandpiper, Bartramia longicauda (A)
 Whimbrel, Numenius phaeopus
 Little curlew, Numenius minutus (A)
 Slender-billed curlew, Numenius tenuirostris (A) (critically endangered)
 Eurasian curlew, Numenius arquata (near-threatened)
 Bar-tailed godwit, Limosa lapponica (near-threatened)
 Black-tailed godwit, Limosa limosa (near-threatened)
 Ruddy turnstone, Arenaria interpres
 Great knot, Calidris tenuirostris (A) (endangered)
 Red knot, Calidris canutus (near-threatened)
 Ruff, Calidris pugnax
 Broad-billed sandpiper, Calidris falcinellus (A)
 Sharp-tailed sandpiper, Calidris acuminata (A)
 Stilt sandpiper, Calidris himantopus (A)
 Curlew sandpiper, Calidris ferruginea (near-threatened)
 Temminck's stint, Calidris temminckii
 Long-toed stint, Calidris subminuta (A)
 Red-necked stint, Calidris ruficollis (A) (near-threatened)
 Sanderling, Calidris alba
 Dunlin, Calidris alpina
 Purple sandpiper, Calidris maritima
 Baird's sandpiper, Calidris bairdii (A)
 Little stint, Calidris minuta
 Least sandpiper, Calidris minutilla (A)
 White-rumped sandpiper, Calidris fuscicollis (A)
 Buff-breasted sandpiper, Calidris subruficollis (A) (near-threatened)
 Pectoral sandpiper, Calidris melanotos (A)
 Semipalmated sandpiper, Calidris pusilla (A) (near-threatened)
 Western sandpiper, Calidris mauri (A)
 Long-billed dowitcher, Limnodromus scolopaceus (A)
 Jack snipe, Lymnocryptes minimus
 Eurasian woodcock, Scolopax rusticola
 Great snipe, Gallinago media (A) (extirpated) (near-threatened)
 Common snipe, Gallinago gallinago
 Wilson's snipe, Gallinago delicata (A)
 Terek sandpiper, Xenus cinereus (A)
 Wilson's phalarope, Phalaropus tricolor (A)
 Red-necked phalarope, Phalaropus lobatus
 Red phalarope, Phalaropus fulicarius
 Common sandpiper, Actitis hypoleucos
 Spotted sandpiper, Actitis macularia (A)
 Green sandpiper, Tringa ochropus
 Solitary sandpiper, Tringa solitaria (A)
 Gray-tailed tattler, Tringa brevipes (A) (near-threatened)
 Spotted redshank, Tringa erythropus
 Greater yellowlegs, Tringa melanoleuca (A)
 Common greenshank, Tringa nebularia
 Lesser yellowlegs, Tringa flavipes (A)
 Marsh sandpiper, Tringa stagnatilis (A)
 Wood sandpiper, Tringa glareola
 Common redshank, Tringa totanus

Pratincoles and coursers
Order: CharadriiformesFamily: Glareolidae

Glareolidae is a family of wading birds comprising the pratincoles, which have short legs, long pointed wings and long forked tails, and the coursers, which have long legs, short wings and long, pointed bills which curve downwards.

 Cream-colored courser, Cursorius cursor (A)
 Collared pratincole, Glareola pratincola (A)
 Oriental pratincole, Glareola maldivarum (A)
 Black-winged pratincole, Glareola nordmanni (A) (near-threatened)

Skuas and jaegers
Order: CharadriiformesFamily: Stercorariidae

The family Stercorariidae are, in general, medium to large birds, typically with grey or brown plumage, often with white markings on the wings. They nest on the ground in temperate and arctic regions and are long-distance migrants.

 Great skua, Stercorarius skua
 Pomarine jaeger, Stercorarius pomarinus
 Parasitic jaeger, Stercorarius parasiticus
 Long-tailed jaeger, Stercorarius longicaudus (A)

Auks, murres, and puffins
Order: CharadriiformesFamily: Alcidae

Auks are superficially similar to penguins due to their black-and-white colors, their upright posture and some of their habits, however they are not related to the penguins and differ in being able to fly. Auks live on the open sea, only deliberately coming ashore to nest.

 Dovekie, Alle alle
 Common murre, Uria aalge
 Thick-billed murre, Uria lomvia (A)
 Razorbill, Alca torda (near-threatened)
 Great auk, Pinguinus impennis (B) (extinct)
 Black guillemot, Cepphus grylle (A)
 Atlantic puffin, Fratercula arctica (vulnerable)

Gulls, terns, and skimmers
Order: CharadriiformesFamily: Laridae

Laridae is a family of medium to large seabirds, the gulls, terns, and skimmers. Gulls are typically grey or white, often with black markings on the head or wings. They have stout, longish bills and webbed feet. Terns are a group of generally medium to large seabirds typically with grey or white plumage, often with black markings on the head. Most terns hunt fish by diving but some pick insects off the surface of fresh water. Terns are generally long-lived birds, with several species known to live in excess of 30 years.

 Black-legged kittiwake, Rissa tridactyla (vulnerable)
 Ivory gull, Pagophila eburnea (A) (near-threatened)
 Sabine's gull, Xema sabini
 Slender-billed gull, Chroicocephalus genei (A)
 Bonaparte's gull, Chroicocephalus philadelphia (A)
 Black-headed gull, Chroicocephalus ridibundus
 Little gull, Hydrocoloeus minutus
 Ross's gull, Rhodostethia rosea (A)
 Laughing gull, Leucophaeus atricilla (A)
 Franklin's gull, Leucophaeus pipixcan (A)
 Mediterranean gull, Ichthyaetus melanocephalus
 Pallas's gull, Ichthyaetus ichthyaetus (A)
 Audouin's gull, Ichthyaetus audouinii (A)
 Common gull, Larus canus
 Ring-billed gull, Larus delawarensis (A)
 Herring gull, Larus argentatus
 Yellow-legged gull, Larus michahellis
 Caspian gull, Larus cachinnans
 Iceland gull, Larus glaucoides
 Lesser black-backed gull, Larus fuscus
 Glaucous gull, Larus hyperboreus
 Great black-backed gull, Larus marinus
 Sooty tern, Onychoprion fuscatus (A)
 Bridled tern, Onychoprion anaethetus (A)
 Little tern, Sternula albifrons
 Gull-billed tern, Gelochelidon nilotica
 Caspian tern, Hydroprogne caspia
 Black tern, Chlidonias niger
 White-winged tern, Chlidonias leucopterus
 Whiskered tern, Chlidonias hybrida
 Roseate tern, Sterna dougallii (A)
 Common tern, Sterna hirundo
 Arctic tern, Sterna paradisaea
 Forster's tern, Sterna forsteri (A)
 Sandwich tern, Thalasseus sandvicensis
 Elegant tern, Thalasseus elegans (A)

Tropicbirds
Order: PhaethontiformesFamily: Phaethontidae

Tropicbirds are slender white birds of tropical oceans, with exceptionally long central tail feathers. Their heads and long wings have black markings.

Red-billed tropicbird, Phaethon aethereus (A)

Loons
Order: GaviiformesFamily: Gaviidae

Loons, known as divers in Europe, are a group of aquatic birds found in many parts of North America and northern Europe. They are the size of a large duck or small goose, which they somewhat resemble when swimming, but to which they are completely unrelated.

 Red-throated loon, Gavia stellata
 Arctic loon, Gavia arctica
 Common loon, Gavia immer
 Yellow-billed loon, Gavia adamsii (A) (near-threatened)

Southern storm-petrels
Order: ProcellariiformesFamily: Oceanitidae

Southern storm petrels, are  seabirds in the family Oceanitidae, part of the order Procellariiformes. These smallest of seabirds feed on planktonic crustaceans and small fish picked from the surface, typically while hovering. Their flight is fluttering and sometimes bat-like.

 Wilson's storm-petrel, Oceanites oceanicus (A)
 White-faced storm-petrel, Pelagodroma marina (A)

Northern storm-petrels
Order: ProcellariiformesFamily: Hydrobatidae

The northern storm-petrels are relatives of the petrels and are the smallest seabirds. They feed on planktonic crustaceans and small fish picked from the surface, typically while hovering. The flight is fluttering and sometimes bat-like.

 European storm-petrel, Hydrobates pelagicus (A)
 Leach's storm-petrel, Hydrobates leucorhous (vulnerable)

Shearwaters and petrels
Order: ProcellariiformesFamily: Procellariidae

The procellariids are the main group of medium-sized "true petrels", characterised by united nostrils with medium septum and a long outer functional primary. 

 Northern fulmar, Fulmarus glacialis
 Fea's petrel, Pterodroma feae (A)
 Cory's shearwater, Calonectris borealis (A)
 Great shearwater, Ardenna gravis (A)
 Sooty shearwater, Ardenna griseus (near-threatened)
 Manx shearwater, Puffinus puffinus
 Balearic shearwater, Puffinus mauretanicus (A) (critically endangered)

Storks
Order: CiconiiformesFamily: Ciconiidae

Storks are large, long-legged, long-necked, wading birds with long, stout bills. Storks are mute, but bill-clattering is an important mode of communication at the nest. Their nests can be large and may be reused for many years. Many species are migratory.

 Black stork, Ciconia nigra
 White stork, Ciconia ciconia

Boobies and gannets
Order: SuliformesFamily: Sulidae

The sulids comprise the gannets and boobies. Both groups are medium to large coastal seabirds that plunge-dive for fish.

 Brown booby, Sula leucogaster (A)
 Northern gannet, Morus bassanus

Cormorants and shags
Order: SuliformesFamily: Phalacrocoracidae

Phalacrocoracidae is a family of medium to large coastal, fish-eating seabirds that includes cormorants and shags. Plumage colouration varies, with the majority having mainly dark plumage, some species being black-and-white and a few being colourful.

 Pygmy cormorant, Microcarbo pygmeus (A)
 Great cormorant, Phalacrocorax carbo
 European shag, Gulosus aristotelis

Pelicans
Order: PelecaniformesFamily: Pelecanidae

Pelicans are large water birds with a distinctive pouch under their beak. As with other members of the order Pelecaniformes, they have webbed feet with four toes.

 Great white pelican, Pelecanus onocrotalus (A)
 Dalmatian pelican, Pelecanus crispus (A) (near-threatened)

Heron, egrets, and bitterns
Order: PelecaniformesFamily: Ardeidae

The family Ardeidae contains the bitterns, herons and egrets. Herons and egrets are medium to large wading birds with long necks and legs. Bitterns tend to be shorter necked and more wary. Members of Ardeidae fly with their necks retracted, unlike other long-necked birds such as storks, ibises and spoonbills.

 Great bittern, Botaurus stellaris
 Little bittern, Ixobrychus minutus
 Gray heron, Ardea cinerea
 Purple heron, Ardea purpurea
 Great egret, Ardea alba
 Little egret, Egretta garzetta
 Cattle egret, Bubulcus ibis
 Squacco heron, Ardeola ralloides (A)
 Green heron, Butorides virescens (A)
 Striated heron, Butorides striata (A)
 Black-crowned night-heron, Nycticorax nycticorax
 Yellow-crowned night-heron, Nyctanassa violacea (A)

Ibises and spoonbills
Order: PelecaniformesFamily: Threskiornithidae

Threskiornithidae is a family of large terrestrial and wading birds which includes the ibises and spoonbills. They have long, broad wings with 11 primary and about 20 secondary feathers. They are strong fliers and despite their size and weight, very capable soarers.

 Glossy ibis, Plegadis falcinellus
 African sacred ibis, Threskiornis aethiopicus (I)
 Northern bald ibis, Geronticus eremita (I)
 Eurasian spoonbill, Platalea leucorodia

Osprey
Order: AccipitriformesFamily: Pandionidae

The family Pandionidae contains only one species, the osprey. The osprey is a medium-large raptor which is a specialist fish-eater with a worldwide distribution.

 Osprey, Pandion haliaetus

Hawks, eagles, and kites
Order: AccipitriformesFamily: Accipitridae

Accipitridae is a family of birds of prey, which includes hawks, eagles, kites, harriers and Old World vultures. These birds have powerful hooked beaks for tearing flesh from their prey, strong legs, powerful talons and keen eyesight.

 Black-winged kite, Elanus caeruleus (A)
 Bearded vulture, Gypaetus barbatus (A)
 Egyptian vulture, Neophron percnopterus (A) (endangered)
 European honey-buzzard, Pernis apivorus
 Cinereous vulture, Aegypius monachus (A) (near-threatened)
Rüppell's griffon, Gyps rueppelli (A)
 Eurasian griffon, Gyps fulvus (A)
 Short-toed snake-eagle, Circaetus gallicus (A)
 Lesser spotted eagle, Clanga pomarina (A)
 Greater spotted eagle, Clanga clanga (A) (vulnerable)
 Booted eagle, Hieraaetus pennatus (A)
 Steppe eagle, Aquila nipalensis (A) (endangered)
 Spanish eagle, Aquila adalberti (A) (vulnerable)
 Imperial eagle, Aquila heliaca (A) (vulnerable)
 Golden eagle, Aquila chrysaetos (A)
 Bonelli's eagle, Aquila fasciata (A)
 Eurasian marsh-harrier, Circus aeruginosus
 Hen harrier, Circus cyaneus
 Northern harrier, Circus hudsonius (A) 
 Pallid harrier, Circus macrourus (A) (near-threatened)
 Montagu's harrier, Circus pygargus
 Eurasian sparrowhawk, Accipiter nisus
 Northern goshawk, Accipiter gentilis
 Red kite, Milvus milvus (near-threatened)
 Black kite, Milvus migrans
 White-tailed eagle, Haliaeetus albicilla
 Rough-legged hawk, Buteo lagopus
 Common buzzard, Buteo buteo
 Long-legged buzzard, Buteo rufinus (A)

Barn-owls
Order: StrigiformesFamily: Tytonidae

Barn owls are medium to large owls with large heads and characteristic heart-shaped faces. They have long strong legs with powerful talons.

 Barn owl, Tyto alba

Owls
Order: StrigiformesFamily: Strigidae

The typical owls are small to large solitary nocturnal birds of prey. They have large forward-facing eyes and ears, a hawk-like beak and a conspicuous circle of feathers around each eye called a facial disk

 Eurasian scops-owl, Otus scops 
 Eurasian eagle-owl, Bubo bubo
 Snowy owl, Bubo scandiacus (A) (vulnerable)
 Northern hawk owl, Surnia ulula (A)
 Eurasian pygmy-owl, Glaucidium passerinum (A)
 Little owl, Athene noctua
 Tawny owl, Strix aluco
 Long-eared owl, Asio otus
 Short-eared owl, Asio flammeus
 Boreal owl, Aegolius funereus (A)

Hoopoes
Order: BucerotiformesFamily: Upupidae

Hoopoes have black, white and orangey-pink coloring with a large erectile crest on their head. 

 Eurasian hoopoe, Upupa epops

Kingfishers
Order: CoraciiformesFamily: Alcedinidae

Kingfishers are medium-sized birds with large heads, long, pointed bills, short legs and stubby tails. 

 Common kingfisher, Alcedo atthis
 Belted kingfisher, Ceryle alcyon (A)

Bee-eaters
Order: CoraciiformesFamily: Meropidae

The bee-eaters are a group of near passerine birds in the family Meropidae. Most species are found in Africa but others occur in southern Europe, Madagascar, Australia and New Guinea. They are characterised by richly colored plumage, slender bodies and usually elongated central tail feathers. All are colourful and have long downturned bills and pointed wings, which give them a swallow-like appearance when seen from afar. 

 Blue-cheeked bee-eater, Merops persicus (A)
 European bee-eater, Merops apiaster

Rollers
Order: CoraciiformesFamily: Coraciidae

Rollers resemble crows in size and build, but are more closely related to the kingfishers and bee-eaters. They share the colourful appearance of those groups with blues and browns predominating. The two inner front toes are connected, but the outer toe is not. 

 European roller, Coracias garrulus (A)

Woodpeckers
Order: PiciformesFamily: Picidae

Woodpeckers are small to medium-sized birds with chisel-like beaks, short legs, stiff tails and long tongues used for capturing insects. Some species have feet with two toes pointing forward and two backward, while several species have only three toes. Many woodpeckers have the habit of tapping noisily on tree trunks with their beaks.

 Eurasian wryneck, Jynx torquilla
 Middle spotted woodpecker, Dendrocoptes medius
 Great spotted woodpecker, Dendrocopos major
 Lesser spotted woodpecker, Dryobates minor
 Gray-headed woodpecker, Picus canus (A)
 Eurasian green woodpecker, Picus viridis
 Black woodpecker, Dryocopus martius

Falcons and caracaras
Order: FalconiformesFamily: Falconidae

Falconidae is a family of diurnal birds of prey. They differ from hawks, eagles and kites in that they kill with their beaks instead of their talons.

 Lesser kestrel, Falco naumanni (A)
 Eurasian kestrel, Falco tinnunculus
 American kestrel, Falco sparverius (A)
 Red-footed falcon, Falco vespertinus (near-threatened)
 Eleonora's falcon, Falco eleonorae (A)
 Merlin, Falco columbarius
 Eurasian hobby, Falco subbuteo
 Gyrfalcon, Falco rusticolus (A)
 Peregrine falcon, Falco peregrinus

Old World parrots
Order: PsittaciformesFamily: Psittaculidae

Characteristic features of parrots include a strong curved bill, an upright stance, strong legs, and clawed zygodactyl feet. Many parrots are vividly colored, and some are multi-colored. Old World parrots are found from Africa east across south and southeast Asia and Oceania to Australia and New Zealand.

 Alexandrine parakeet, Psittacula eupatria (I) (near-threatened)
 Rose-ringed parakeet, Psittacula krameri (I)

Vireos, shrike-babblers, and erpornis
Order: PasseriformesFamily: Vireonidae

The vireos are a group of small to medium-sized passerine birds restricted to the New World and Southeast Asia.

 Red-eyed vireo, Vireo olivaceus (A)

Old World orioles
Order: PasseriformesFamily: Oriolidae

The Old World orioles are colourful passerine birds. They are not related to the New World orioles. 

 Eurasian golden oriole, Oriolus oriolus

Shrikes
Order: PasseriformesFamily: Laniidae

Shrikes are passerine birds known for their habit of catching other birds and small animals and impaling the uneaten portions of their bodies on thorns. A shrike's beak is hooked, like that of a typical bird of prey.

 Red-backed shrike, Lanius collurio
 Red-tailed shrike, Lanius phoenicuroides (A)
 Isabelline shrike, Lanius isabellinus (A)
 Brown shrike, Lanius cristatus (A)
 Long-tailed shrike, Lanius schach (A)
 Northern shrike, Lanius borealis (A)
 Great gray shrike, Lanius excubitor
 Lesser gray shrike, Lanius minor (A)
 Masked shrike, Lanius nubicus (A)
 Woodchat shrike, Lanius senator

Crows, jays, and magpies
Order: PasseriformesFamily: Corvidae

The family Corvidae includes crows, ravens, jays, choughs, magpies, treepies, nutcrackers and ground jays. Corvids are above average in size among the Passeriformes, and some of the larger species show high levels of intelligence.

 Eurasian jay, Garrulus glandarius
 Eurasian magpie, Pica pica
 Eurasian nutcracker, Nucifraga caryocatactes (A)
 Yellow-billed chough, Pyrrhocorax graculus (A)
 Eurasian jackdaw, Corvus monedula
 Daurian jackdaw, Corvus dauuricus (A)
 House crow, Corvus splendens (I)
 Rook, Corvus frugilegus
 Carrion crow, Corvus corone
 Hooded crow, Corvus cornix
 Common raven, Corvus corax

Tits, chickadees, and titmice
Order: PasseriformesFamily: Paridae

The Paridae are mainly small stocky woodland species with short stout bills. Some have crests. They are adaptable birds, with a mixed diet including seeds and insects.

 Coal tit, Periparus ater
 Crested tit, Lophophanes cristatus
 Marsh tit, Poecile palustris
 Willow tit, Poecile montana
 Eurasian blue tit, Cyanistes caeruleus
 Great tit, Parus major

Penduline-tits
Order: PasseriformesFamily: Remizidae

The penduline-tits are a group of small passerine birds related to the true tits. They are insectivores.

 Eurasian penduline-tit, Remiz pendulinus

Larks
Order: PasseriformesFamily: Alaudidae

Larks are small terrestrial birds with often extravagant songs and display flights. Most larks are fairly dull in appearance. Their food is insects and seeds.

 Horned lark, Eremophila alpestris
 Greater short-toed lark, Calandrella brachydactyla (A)
 Bimaculated lark, Bimaculated (A)
 Calandra lark, Melanocorypha calandra (A)
 Wood lark, Lullula arborea
 Eurasian skylark, Alauda arvensis
 Crested lark, Galerida cristata (A)

Bearded reedling
Order: PasseriformesFamily: Panuridae

This species, the only one in its family, is found in reed beds throughout temperate Europe and Asia.

 Bearded reedling, Panurus biarmicus

Cisticolas and allies
Order: PasseriformesFamily: Cisticolidae

The Cisticolidae are warblers found mainly in warmer southern regions of the Old World. They are generally very small birds of drab brown or grey appearance found in open country such as grassland or scrub.

 Zitting cisticola, Cisticola juncidis

Reed warblers and allies
Order: PasseriformesFamily: Acrocephalidae

The members of this family are usually rather large for "warblers". Most are rather plain olivaceous brown above with much yellow to beige below. They are usually found in open woodland, reedbeds, or tall grass. The family occurs mostly in southern to western Eurasia and surroundings, but it also ranges far into the Pacific, with some species in Africa.

 Booted warbler, Iduna caligata (A)
 Sykes's warbler, Iduna rama (A)
 Eastern olivaceous warbler, Iduna pallida (A)
 Upcher's warbler, Hippolais languida (A)
 Melodious warbler, Hippolais polyglotta
 Icterine warbler, Hippolais icterina
 Aquatic warbler, Acrocephalus paludicola (vulnerable)
 Moustached warbler, Acrocephalus melanopogon (A)
 Sedge warbler, Acrocephalus schoenobaenus
 Paddyfield warbler, Acrocephalus agricola (A)
 Blyth's reed warbler, Acrocephalus dumetorum (A)
 Marsh warbler, Acrocephalus palustris
 Eurasian reed warbler, Acrocephalus scirpaceus
 Great reed warbler, Acrocephalus arundinaceus

Grassbirds and allies 
Order: PasseriformesFamily: Locustellidae

Locustellidae are a family of small insectivorous songbirds found mainly in Eurasia, Africa, and the Australian region. They are smallish birds with tails that are usually long and pointed, and tend to be drab brownish or buffy all over.

 Pallas's grasshopper warbler, Helopsaltes certhiola (A)
 Lanceolated warbler, Locustella lanceolata (A)
 River warbler, Locustella fluviatilis
 Savi's warbler, Locustella luscinioides
 Common grasshopper-warbler, Locustella naevia

Swallows
Order: PasseriformesFamily: Hirundinidae

The family Hirundinidae is adapted to aerial feeding. They have a slender streamlined body, long pointed wings and a short bill with a wide gape. The feet are adapted to perching rather than walking, and the front toes are partially joined at the base.

 Purple martin, Progne subis (A)
 Bank swallow, Riparia riparia
 Eurasian crag-martin, Ptyonoprogne rupestris (A)
 Barn swallow, Hirundo rustica
 Red-rumped swallow, Hirundo daurica
 Common house-martin, Delichon urbicum

Leaf warblers
Order: PasseriformesFamily: Phylloscopidae

Leaf warblers are a family of small insectivorous birds found mostly in Eurasia and ranging into Wallacea and Africa. The species are of various sizes, often green-plumaged above and yellow below, or more subdued with greyish-green to greyish-brown colors.

 Wood warbler, Phylloscopus sibilatrix
 Western Bonelli's warbler, Phylloscopus bonelli (A)
 Eastern Bonelli's warbler, Phylloscopus orientalis (A)
 Yellow-browed warbler, Phylloscopus inornatus
 Hume's warbler, Phylloscopus humei (A)
 Pallas's leaf warbler, Phylloscopus proregulus (A)
 Radde's warbler, Phylloscopus schwarzi (A)
 Dusky warbler, Phylloscopus fuscatus (A)
 Willow warbler, Phylloscopus trochilus
 Common chiffchaff, Phylloscopus collybita
 Iberian chiffchaff, Phylloscopus ibericus (A)
 Eastern crowned warbler, Phylloscopus coronatus (A)
 Green warbler, Phylloscopus nitidus (A)
 Greenish warbler, Phylloscopus trochiloides (A)
 Two-barred warbler, Phylloscopus plumbeitarsus (A)
 Arctic warbler, Phylloscopus borealis (A)

Bush warblers and allies
Order: PasseriformesFamily: Scotocercidae

The members of this family are found throughout Africa, Asia, and Polynesia. Their taxonomy is in flux, and some authorities place some genera in other families.

 Cetti's warbler, Cettia cetti

Long-tailed tits
Order: PasseriformesFamily: Aegithalidae

Long-tailed tits are a group of small passerine birds with medium to long tails. They make woven bag nests in trees. Most eat a mixed diet which includes insects. 

 Long-tailed tit, Aegithalos caudatus

Sylviid warblers, parrotbills, and allies
Order: PasseriformesFamily: Sylviidae

The family Sylviidae is a group of small insectivorous passerine birds. They mainly occur as breeding species, as the common name implies, in Europe, Asia and, to a lesser extent, Africa. Most are of generally undistinguished appearance, but many have distinctive songs.

 Eurasian blackcap, Sylvia atricapilla
 Garden warbler, Sylvia borin
 Barred warbler, Curruca nisoria
 Lesser whitethroat, Curruca curruca
 Western Orphean warbler, Curruca hortensis (A)
 Eastern Orphean warbler, Curruca crassirostris (A)
 African desert warbler, Curruca deserti (A)
 Asian desert warbler, Curruca nana (A)
 Sardinian warbler, Curruca melanocephala (A)
 Moltoni's warbler, Curruca subalpina (A)
 Western subalpine warbler, Curruca iberiae (A)
 Eastern subalpine warbler, Curruca cantillans (A)
 Greater whitethroat, Curruca communis
 Spectacled warbler, Curruca conspicillata (A)
 Marmora's warbler, Curruca sarda (A)
 Dartford warbler, Curruca undata (A) (near-threatened)
 Vinous-throated parrotbill, Sinosuthora webbiana (I)
 Ashy-throated parrotbill, Sinosuthora alphonsiana (I)

Kinglets
Order: PasseriformesFamily: Regulidae

The kinglets, also called crests, are a small group of birds often included in the Old World warblers, but frequently given family status because they also resemble the titmice. 

 Goldcrest, Regulus regulus
 Common firecrest, Regulus ignicapilla

Wallcreeper
Order: PasseriformesFamily: Tichodromidae

The wallcreeper is a small bird related to the nuthatch family, which has stunning crimson, grey and black plumage.

 Wallcreeper, Tichodroma muraria (A)

Nuthatches
Order: PasseriformesFamily: Sittidae

Nuthatches are small woodland birds. They have the unusual ability to climb down trees head first, unlike other birds which can only go upwards. Nuthatches have big heads, short tails and powerful bills and feet.

 Eurasian nuthatch, Sitta europaea

Treecreepers
Order: PasseriformesFamily: Certhiidae

Treecreepers are small woodland birds, brown above and white below. They have thin pointed down-curved bills, which they use to extricate insects from bark. They have stiff tail feathers, like woodpeckers, which they use to support themselves on vertical trees.

 Eurasian treecreeper, Certhia familiaris
 Short-toed treecreeper, Certhia brachydactyla

Wrens
Order: PasseriformesFamily: Troglodytidae

The wrens are mainly small and inconspicuous except for their loud songs. These birds have short wings and thin down-turned bills. Several species often hold their tails upright. All are insectivorous.

 Eurasian wren, Troglodytes troglodytes

Dippers
Order: PasseriformesFamily: Cinclidae

Dippers are a group of perching birds whose habitat includes aquatic environments in the Americas, Europe and Asia. They are named for their bobbing or dipping movements.

 White-throated dipper, Cinclus cinclus

Starlings
Order: PasseriformesFamily: Sturnidae

Starlings are small to medium-sized passerine birds. Their flight is strong and direct and they are very gregarious. Their preferred habitat is fairly open country. They eat insects and fruit. Plumage is typically dark with a metallic sheen. 

 European starling, Sturnus vulgaris
 Rosy starling, Pastor roseus (A)
 Daurian starling, Agropsar sturninus (A)

Mockingbirds and thrashers
Order: PasseriformesFamily: Mimidae

The mimids are a family of passerine birds which includes thrashers, mockingbirds, tremblers, and the New World catbirds. These birds are notable for their vocalization, especially their remarkable ability to mimic a wide variety of birds and other sounds heard outdoors. The species tend towards dull grays and browns in their appearance.

 Northern mockingbird, Mimus polyglottos (A)

Thrushes and allies
Order: PasseriformesFamily: Turdidae

The thrushes are a group of passerine birds that occur mainly in the Old World. They are plump, soft plumaged, small to medium-sized insectivores or sometimes omnivores, often feeding on the ground. Many have attractive songs.

 White's thrush, Zoothera aurea (A)
 Gray-cheeked thrush, Catharus minimus (A)
 Hermit thrush, Catharus guttatus (A)
 Siberian thrush, Geokichla sibirica (A)
 Mistle thrush, Turdus viscivorus
 Song thrush, Turdus philomelos
 Redwing, Turdus iliacus (near-threatened)
 Eurasian blackbird, Turdus merula
 American robin, Turdus migratorius (A)
 Eyebrowed thrush, Turdus obscurus (A)
 Fieldfare, Turdus pilaris
 Ring ouzel, Turdus torquatus
 Black-throated thrush, Turdus atrogularis (A)
 Dusky thrush, Turdus naumanni (A)

Old World flycatchers
Order: PasseriformesFamily: Muscicapidae

Old World flycatchers are a large group of small passerine birds native to the Old World. They are mainly small arboreal insectivores. The appearance of these birds is highly varied, but they mostly have weak songs and harsh calls.

 Spotted flycatcher, Muscicapa striata
 Rufous-tailed scrub-robin, Cercotrichas galactotes (A)
 European robin, Erithacus rubecula
 White-throated robin, Irania gutturalis (A)
 Thrush nightingale, Luscinia luscinia
 Common nightingale, Luscinia megarhynchos
 Bluethroat, Luscinia svecica
 Siberian rubythroat, Calliope calliope (A)
 Red-flanked bluetail, Tarsiger cyanurus (A)
 Red-breasted flycatcher, Ficedula parva
 Semicollared flycatcher, Ficedula semitorquata (A)
 European pied flycatcher, Ficedula hypoleuca
 Collared flycatcher, Ficedula albicollis (A)
 Common redstart, Phoenicurus phoenicurus
 Black redstart, Phoenicurus ochruros
 Rufous-tailed rock thrush, Monticola saxatilis (A)
 Blue rock-thrush, Monticola solitarius (A)
 Whinchat, Saxicola rubetra
 European stonechat, Saxicola rubicola
 Siberian stonechat, Saxicola maurus (A)
 Amur stonechat, Saxicola stejnegeri (A)
 Northern wheatear, Oenanthe oenanthe
 Isabelline wheatear, Oenanthe isabellina (A)
 Desert wheatear, Oenanthe deserti (A)
 Western black-eared wheatear, Oenanthe hispanica (A)
 Eastern black-eared wheatear, Oenanthe melanoleuca (A)
 Pied wheatear, Oenanthe pleschanka (A)
 White-crowned wheatear, Oenanthe leucopyga (A)

Waxwings
Order: PasseriformesFamily: Bombycillidae

The waxwings are a group of birds with soft silky plumage and unique red tips to some of the wing feathers. In the Bohemian and cedar waxwings, these tips look like sealing wax and give the group its name. These are arboreal birds of northern forests. They live on insects in summer and berries in winter.

 Bohemian waxwing, Bombycilla garrulus

Accentors
Order: PasseriformesFamily: Prunellidae

The accentors are in the only bird family, Prunellidae, which is completely endemic to the Palearctic. They are small, fairly drab species superficially similar to sparrows.

 Alpine accentor, Prunella collaris (A)
 Siberian accentor, Prunella montanella (A)
 Dunnock, Prunella modularis

Old World sparrows
Order: PasseriformesFamily: Passeridae

Old World sparrows are small passerine birds. In general, sparrows tend to be small, plump, brown or grey birds with short tails and short powerful beaks. Sparrows are seed eaters, but they also consume small insects.

 House sparrow, Passer domesticus
 Italian sparrow, Passer italiae (A)
 Spanish sparrow, Passer hispaniolensis (A)
 Eurasian tree sparrow, Passer montanus

Wagtails and pipits
Order: PasseriformesFamily: Motacillidae

Motacillidae is a family of small passerine birds with medium to long tails. They include the wagtails, longclaws and pipits. They are slender, ground feeding insectivores of open country. 

 Gray wagtail,  Motacilla cinerea
 Western yellow wagtail, Motacilla flava
 Eastern yellow wagtail, Motacilla tschutschensis (A)
 Citrine wagtail,  Motacilla citreola (A)
 White wagtail,  Motacilla alba.
 Richard's pipit, Anthus richardi
 Blyth's pipit, Anthus godlewskii (A)
 Tawny pipit, Anthus campestris
 Meadow pipit, Anthus pratensis (near-threatened)
 Tree pipit, Anthus trivialis
 Olive-backed pipit, Anthus hodgsoni (A)
 Red-throated pipit, Anthus cervinus (A)
 Water pipit, Anthus spinoletta
 Rock pipit, Anthus petrosus

Finches, euphonias, and allies
Order: PasseriformesFamily: Fringillidae

Finches are seed-eating passerine birds, that are small to moderately large and have a strong beak, usually conical and in some species very large. All have twelve tail feathers and nine primaries. These birds have a bouncing flight with alternating bouts of flapping and gliding on closed wings, and most sing well.

 Common chaffinch, Fringilla coelebs
 Brambling, Fringilla montifringilla
 Hawfinch, Coccothraustes coccothraustes
 Common rosefinch, Carpodacus erythrinus
 Pine grosbeak, Pinicola enucleator (A)
 Eurasian bullfinch, Pyrrhula pyrrhula
 Trumpeter finch, Bucanetes githagineus (A)
 European greenfinch, Chloris chloris
 Twite, Linaria flavirostris
 Eurasian linnet, Linaria cannabina
 Common redpoll, Acanthis flammea
 Lesser redpoll, Acanthis cabaret		
 Hoary redpoll, Acanthis hornemanni (A)
 Parrot crossbill, Loxia pytyopsittacus
 Red crossbill, Loxia curvirostra
 White-winged crossbill, Loxia leucoptera (A)
 European goldfinch, Carduelis carduelis
 Citril finch, Carduelis citrinella (B)
 European serin, Serinus serinus
 Eurasian siskin, Spinus spinus

Longspurs and snow buntings
Order: PasseriformesFamily: Calcariidae

The Calcariidae are a group of passerine birds which had been traditionally grouped with the New World sparrows, but differ in a number of respects and are usually found in open grassy areas.

 Lapland longspur, Calcarius lapponicus
 Snow bunting, Plectrophenax nivalis

Old World buntings
Order: PasseriformesFamily: Emberizidae

The emberizids are a large family of passerine birds. They are seed-eating birds with distinctively shaped bills.  Many emberizid species have distinctive head patterns.

 Black-headed bunting, Emberiza melanocephala (A)
 Red-headed bunting, Emberiza bruniceps (A)
 Corn bunting, Emberiza calandra
 Rock bunting, Emberiza cia (A)
 Cirl bunting, Emberiza cirlus (A)
 Yellowhammer, Emberiza citrinella
 Pine bunting, Emberiza leucocephalos (A)
 Gray-necked bunting, Emberiza buchanani (A)
 Ortolan bunting, Emberiza hortulana
 Cretzschmar's bunting, Emberiza caesia (A)
 Reed bunting, Emberiza schoeniclus
 Yellow-breasted bunting, Emberiza aureola (A) (critically endangered)
 Little bunting, Emberiza pusilla
 Rustic bunting, Emberiza rustica (vulnerable)
 Black-faced bunting, Emberiza spodocephala (A)
 Chestnut bunting, Emberiza rutila (A)
 Yellow-browed bunting, Emberiza chrysophrys (A)

New World sparrows
Order: PasseriformesFamily: Passerellidae

The New World sparrows (or American sparrows) are a large family of seed-eating passerine birds with distinctively finch-like bills.

 Dark-eyed junco, Junco hyemalis (A)
 White-crowned sparrow, Zonotrichia leucophrys (A)
 White-throated sparrow, Zonotrichia albicollis (A)
 Song sparrow, Melospiza melodia (A)

Troupials and allies
Order: PasseriformesFamily: Icteridae

Icterids make up a family of small- to medium-sized, often colorful, New-World passerine birds. Most species have black as a predominant plumage color, often enlivened by yellow, orange or red. The species in the family vary widely in size, shape, behavior and coloration.

 Yellow-headed blackbird, Xanthocephalus xanthocephalus (A)
 Bobolink, Dolichonyx oryzivorus (A)
 Baltimore oriole, Icterus galbula (A)
 Common grackle, Quiscalus quiscula (A) (near-threatened)

New World warblers
Order: PasseriformesFamily: Parulidae

The New World warblers are a group of small often colorful passerine birds restricted to the New World. Most are arboreal, but some are more terrestrial. Most members of this family are insectivores.

 Northern waterthrush, Parkesia noveboracensis (A)
 Blackpoll warbler, Setophaga striata (A)
 Yellow-rumped warbler, Setophaga coronata (A)

Cardinals and allies
Order: PasseriformesFamily: Cardinalidae

The cardinals are a family of robust, seed-eating birds with strong bills. They are typically associated with open woodland. The sexes usually have distinct plumages.

 Indigo bunting, Passerina cyanea (A)

See also
Ardea – the official publication of the Netherlands Ornithologists' Union (NOU)
 List of birds
 Lists of birds by region

References

 
 

Lists of birds by country
Lists of birds of Europe
Birds
Birds